Admiral Wulff may refer to:

Christian Wulff (1777–1843), Royal Danish Navy rear admiral
Jørgen Peter Frederik Wulff (1808–1881), Royal Danish Navy admiral
Peter Frederik Wulff (1774–1842), Royal Danish Navy counter admiral

See also
Johnny Wolfe (born 1965), U.S. Navy vice admiral
Max-Eckart Wolff (1902–1988), German Kriegsmarine flotilla admiral